William Edward Robnett (March 7, 1920 – September 20, 1990) was an American football fullback in the All-America Football Conference for the San Francisco 49ers.  He played college football at Agricultural and Mechanical College of Texas (now Texas A&M University) and Texas Technological College (now Texas Tech University) and was drafted in the eighteenth round of the 1946 NFL Draft by the Washington Redskins.

People from Delta County, Texas
Players of American football from Texas
American football fullbacks
Texas A&M Aggies football players
Texas Tech Red Raiders football players
San Francisco 49ers (AAFC) players
1920 births
1990 deaths
San Francisco 49ers players